The president  of Hungary, officially the president of the republic (államelnök, or államfő), is the head of state of Hungary. The office has a largely ceremonial (figurehead) role, but may also veto legislation or send legislation to the Constitutional Court for review. Most other executive powers, such as selecting government ministers and leading legislative initiatives, are vested in the office of the prime minister instead.

The current president of Hungary is Katalin Novák, who took office on 10 May 2022. She is the first woman to hold the presidency.

Presidential election 

The Constitution of Hungary provides that the National Assembly (Országgyűlés) elects the president of Hungary for a term of five years. Presidents have a term limit of two terms of office.

Independence of the function 

According to Article 12 (2) of the Constitution, the president, when exercising their function, cannot exercise "a public, political, economic or social function or mission". They may not engage in "any other paid professional activity, and may not receive remuneration for any other activity, other than activities subject to copyright".

Condition for the candidature 

According to Article 10 (2), any Hungarian citizen aged at least 35 years old may be elected as president.

Electoral process 

Called by the president of the National Assembly, the presidential election must be held between 30 and 60 days before the end of the term of the incumbent president, or within 30 days if the office is vacated.

The Constitution states that candidatures must be "proposed in writing by at least one fifth of the members of the National Assembly". They shall be submitted to the president of the National Assembly before the vote. A member of the National Assembly may nominate only one candidate.

The secret ballot must be completed within two consecutive days at the most. In the first round, if one of the candidates obtains more than 2/3 of the votes of all the members of the National Assembly, the candidate is elected.

If no candidate obtains the required majority, the second round is organized between the two candidates who obtained the most votes in the first round. The candidate obtaining the majority of the votes cast in the second round shall be elected president. If the second round is unsuccessful, a new election must be held after new candidatures are submitted.

Oath of office 

According to Article 11 (6), the president of the republic must take an oath before the National Assembly.

The oath is as follows:

Competencies and prerogatives 

According to the Basic Law, "the Head of State of Hungary is the President of the Republic who expresses the unity of the nation and oversees the democratic functioning of State institutions". Commander-in-Chief of the Hungarian Defence Forces, "represents Hungary", "may participate in the sittings of the National Assembly and take the floor", "initiate laws" or a national referendum. It determines the date of elections, participates in "decisions concerning particular states of law" (state of war, emergency...), convokes the National Assembly after the elections, can dissolve it, check the conformity of a law by the Constitutional Court.

The head of state "proposes the names of the Prime Minister, the President of the Curia, the Principal Public Prosecutor and the Commissioner of Fundamental Rights", the sole nominator of judges and the President of the Budget Council. With the "countersignature of a member of the government", the head of state appoints the ministers, the president of the National Bank of Hungary, the heads of independent regulatory entities, university professors, generals, mandate ambassadors and university rectors, "awards decorations, rewards and titles". However, the president can refuse to make these appointments "if the statutory conditions are not fulfilled or if it concludes for a well-founded reason that there would be a serious disturbance to the democratic functioning of the State institutions".

Also with the agreement of the government, the head of state "exercises the right of individual pardon", "decides matters of organization of territory" and "cases concerning the acquisition and deprivation of citizenship".

Immunity and removal from office 

According to Article 12 of the Basic Law, "the President of the Republic is inviolable". Consequently, all criminal proceedings against the president can only take place after the end of their mandate.

However, Article 13 (2) of the Constitution provides for the removal of the president. This can only take place if the president "intentionally violates the Basic Law or another law in the performance of duties, or if they commit an offense voluntarily". In such a case, the motion for removal should be proposed by at least  of the members of the National Assembly.

Subsequently, in proceedings before the Constitutional Court, it is determined whether the president should be relieved of their duties.

If the court establishes the responsibility of the president, the president shall be removed from office.

Succession

Termination of mandate and incapacity 

According to Article 12 (3), the term of office of the president of the republic ends:
 When the term of office is completed;
 By the death of the President while in office;
 By an incapacity which renders impossible the performance of their duties for more than 90 days;
 If they no longer meet the conditions for being eligible;
 A declaration of incompatibility of duties;
 By resignation;
 By dismissal.

According to Article 12 (4), the National Assembly must decide by a majority of 2/3 of all its members to decide the incapacity of the president of the republic to exercise their responsibilities for more than 90 days.

Absence (temporary incapacity) 

According to Article 14 (1), if the president of the republic is temporarily incapable of exercising their functions and powers, these are exercised by the speaker of the National Assembly of Hungary, who can not delegate them to deputies and who is replaced in National Assembly duties by one of the deputy speakers of the National Assembly until the end of the president's incapacity.

According to Article 14 (2), the temporary incapacity of the president of the republic is decided by the National Assembly on the proposal of the president themselves, the government, or a member of the National Assembly.

History

Role in the legislative process

Latest election

See also 

 List of heads of state of Hungary

Notes

References

External links 

 Official website

 
Politics of Hungary
Government of Hungary
1989 establishments in Hungary